16 teams participated in the 1997–98 Egyptian Premier League season. The first team in the league was the champion, and qualified to CAF Champions League, while the runner up qualified to the CAF Cup. The season started on 27 September 1997 and concluded on 9 June 1998.
Al Ahly managed to win the league for the 27th time in the club's history.

League table

Top goalscorers

References

1997–98 in African association football leagues
0
Premier